The Pomabamba Province (Quechua Puma Pampa) is one of twenty provinces of the Ancash Region in Peru. It was formerly called Pumapampa (Quechua for "cougar plain") and today it is also known as "The City of Cedars". It was created by law on February 21, 1861.

In this vast region some archaeological sites like Ichik Yaynu, Willka Marka, Runa Marka and the gigantic stone constructions of Yaynu were found with features of the Recuay Culture.

For these ancient copper-colored and fecund places, one of the biggest pre-inca confederations was created, the powerful confederation of conchucos. It was an iron agglomeration of people that presented a hard and brave resistance to the Inca and Spanish armies. During the Republic, don Ramón Castilla, a great marshall from Tarapacá, visited Pomabamba and fell in love with the beautiful Ancash woman from Llumpa, Margarita Mariluz.

Geography 
Other mountains are listed below:

Political division

Pomabamba is divided into four districts, which are:

 Huayllán 
 Parobamba 
 Pomabamba 
 Quinuabamba

Ethnic groups 
The people in the province are mainly indigenous citizens of Quechua descent. Quechua is the language which the majority of the population (84.83%) learnt to speak in childhood, 14.90% of the residents started speaking using the Spanish language (2007 Peru Census).

See also 
 Tinya palla

Sources

External links
  Official website of the Pomabamba Province

Pomabamba Province